Justin Albert Driscoll (September 30, 1920—November 19, 1984) was an American Roman Catholic clergyman. He served as President of Loras College (1967-1970) and Bishop of Fargo (1970-1984).

Biography

Early life 
Justin Driscoll was born on September 30, 1920, in Bernard, Iowa, to William and Agnes (née Healey) Driscoll. He studied at Loras College in Dubuque, Iowa, obtaining a Bachelor of Arts degree in 1942. He completed his postgraduate studies at the Catholic University of America in Washington, D.C.

Priesthood 
Driscoll was ordained to the priesthood for the Archdiocese of Dubuque on July 28, 1945. He then served as a teacher at Loras Academy until 1948, when he became secretary to Archbishop Henry Rohlman. In 1952 he earned his Ph.D. from Catholic University.Returning to Iowa, he served as secretary to Archbishop Leo Binz (1952-1953) and superintendent of Catholic schools in the Archdiocese (1953-1967).

President of Loras College 
Driscoll was named president of Loras College in 1967. During his administration, he gave full scholarships to twelve African American students.  According to later Loras President Francis Friedl, these students were radicalized after spending a summer with Jesse Jackson's organization in Chicago When the students returned to Loras, they occupied a school building and sent a list of demands to the administration.  After the students left the building, they were suspended for a semester.  The semester length of the suspension and other factors made Driscoll unpopular with some faculty, who then sought his resignation.

Bishop of Fargo 
On September 8, 1970, Driscoll was appointed the fifth bishop of the Diocese of Fargo by Pope Paul VI. He received his episcopal consecration on October 18, 1970. from Archbishop Luigi Raimondi, with Archbishops Leo Binz and James Byrne serving as co-consecrators. 

Justin Driscoll died on November 19 1984 in Bismarck, North Dakota, at age 64.

References

1920 births
1984 deaths
Loras College alumni
Catholic University of America alumni
People from Dubuque County, Iowa
Roman Catholic Archdiocese of Dubuque
20th-century Roman Catholic bishops in the United States
Roman Catholic bishops of Fargo
Religious leaders from Iowa
Catholics from Iowa